Zaher Toufic Al Indari (born 26 May 1971) is a Lebanese former professional footballer who played as a striker.

Club career 
Al Indari began his senior career in 1989 with Ahli Aley in the Lebanese Third Division, which merged with Akhaa Club to form Akhaa Ahli Aley in 1990. In 1991–92 Akhaa Ahli Aley won the Lebanese Second Division, gaining promotion to the Lebanese Premier League for the first time in their history.

Al Indari stayed at the club until 2003, when he moved to Safa. In his two seasons at the club, Al Indari scored six league goals, three in each season. After two seasons at the club, in 2005 Al Indari moved back to Akhaa Ahli, which had just relegated to the Lebanese Second Division after 25 years in the top-flight. Al Indari retired following the 2005–06 season.

International career 
Between 1996 and 2001, Al Indari represented Lebanon internationally. He scored four goals in 20 games, with his first goal coming against Saudi Arabia at the 1998 Arab Nations Cup. On 12 December 1998, Al Indari scored a brace against Kazakhstan at the 1998 Asian Games.

Career statistics

International
Scores and results list Lebanon's goal tally first, score column indicates score after each Al Indari goal.

Honours 
Akhaa Ahli Aley
 Lebanese Second Division: 1991–92

Individual
 Lebanese Premier League Best Goal: 1998–99

Notes

References

External links
 
 

1971 births
Living people
People from Baabda District
Lebanese footballers
Association football forwards
Lebanese Premier League players
Akhaa Ahli Aley FC players
Safa SC players
Lebanon international footballers
Asian Games competitors for Lebanon
Footballers at the 1998 Asian Games